This is a list of the 275 constituencies represented in the Parliament of the Republic of Ghana, as at the December 2016 general election. It had been increased from 260 at the previous election in December 2012 parliamentary election. Each constituency is represented by a single member of parliament (MP). There were 230 parliamentary constituencies previously.

History 
At the time Ghana became an independent country, there were 104 seats in parliament. This increased to 198 after 1965 when Ghana became a one party state. At the start of the Second Republic in 1969, the number of seats were increased to 140. This did not change further until the start of the Fourth republic when it was increased from 140 to 200. The number of seats was increased following the December 2000 elections. After the 2000 population census, the number of districts were increased from 110 to 138. The Electoral Commission of Ghana did a demarcation exercise which increased the number of constituencies from 200 to 230. The total list of constituencies was increased to 275 prior to the 2012 Ghanaian general election. This was done by the Electoral Commission of Ghana after the final results of the 2010 population census became available. Following a referendum in December 2018, the number of administrative regions have also been increased from ten to sixteen.

Ahafo Region – 6 seats
The Ahafo Region is one of the two new regions carved out of the Brong-Ahafo Region. The Brong-Ahafo Region was split into three regions following the December 2018 referendum.

Ashanti Region – 47 seats

The number of constituencies in this region increased from 33 to 39 in 2004 and 48 in 2012 prior to the 2012 Ghanaian general election. Some new districts were created in 2008 affecting the location of some constituencies.

Bono Region – 12 seats

The Brong-Ahafo Region was split into three regions following the December 2018 referendum.

Bono East Region – 11 seats
The Bono East Region is one of the two new regions carved out of the Brong Ahafo Region. The Brong-Ahafo Region was split into three regions following the December 2018 referendum.

Central Region – 23 seats

The number of constituencies in the region increased from 17 to 19 in 2004 and 23 in 2012 prior to the 2012 Ghanaian general election.

Eastern Region – 33 seats

The number of constituencies was increased from 26 to 28 in 2004 and 33 in 2012 prior to the 2012 Ghanaian general election.

Greater Accra Region – 34 seats

The number of constituencies increased/spread from 22 to 27 in 2004 and 34 prior to the 2012 Ghanaian general election.

North East Region – 6 seats
The North East Region was created following the December 2018 referendum.

Northern Region – 18 seats

The number of constituencies increased from 23 to 26 in 2004 and 31 in 2012 prior to the 2012 Ghanaian general election. After the division of the region into Northern and North Eastern regions, the region now had 18 constituencies.

Oti Region – 8 seats
The Oti Region was created following the December 2018 referendum.

Savannah Region – 7 seats
The Savannah Region was created following the December 2018 referendum.

Upper East Region – 15 seats

The number of constituencies increased from 12 to 13 in 2004 and 15 in 2012 prior to the 2012 Ghanaian general election.

Upper West Region – 11 seats

The number of constituencies increased from 8 to 10 and 11 in 2012 prior to the 2012 Ghanaian general election.

Volta Region – 18 seats

The number of constituencies increased from 19 to 22 in 2004 and 26 in 2012 prior to the 2012 Ghanaian general election. This reduced to 18 after the December 2018 referendum which led to the creation of 6 new regions. The old Volta Region got split into Oti and Volta Regions.

Western Region – 17 seats

The number of constituencies increased from 19 to 22 in 2004 and 26 in 2012.

Western North Region – 9 seats

See also
Parliament of Ghana
Districts of Ghana
Regions of Ghana

General:and ministers with constituency and elected party

 Administrative divisions of Ghana

Notes

External links and sources 
Ghana Parliament official website
Constituencies and MPs on GhanaDistrict.com
List of new constituencies by region on Ghana government website
List of the new constituencies created in 2004 by National Electoral Commission – Page 11

Politics of Ghana
Parliament of Ghana
Parliament constituencies
Ghana